

The Siachen Muztagh is a remote subrange of the eastern Karakoram Range. Close to 60% is in area controlled by China, 40% in area controlled by India.  Pakistan claims the Indian-controlled portion as part of the Siachen Conflict.  India claims the Chinese-controlled portion.  India administers its portion as part of the Union Territory of Ladakh.  China administers its portion as part of Xinjiang province.

All available maps and atlases (including a detailed delineation of the Siachen Muztagh's limits on the 1990 Swiss Foundation for Alpine Research "Karakoram Sheet 2" map) define the range as between the Shaksgam River on the north, the Urdok Glacier on the northwest (Urdok in Uyghur meaning duck), the Siachen Glacier on the southwest, the Teram Shehr Glacier and Rimo Glacier, and Indira Col on the south, and the uppermost Yarkand River on the east.

Its highest peak is Teram Kangri I, 7,462 metres (24,482 feet).

Selected peaks of the Siachen Muztagh
The following is a table of the peaks in the Siachen Muztagh which are over 7,200 meters (23,622 feet) in elevation and have over 500 meters (1,524 feet) of topographic prominence.
(This is a common criterion for peaks of this stature to be independent.)

References

External links 
Blankonthemap The Northern Kashmir WebSite

Mountain ranges of the Karakoram
Mountain ranges of Xinjiang
Mountain ranges of India
Landforms of Jammu and Kashmir